Griffith–McCune Farmstead Historic District, also known as Rockford Farm, is a historic home and farm and national historic district located near Eolia, Pike County, Missouri.  The district encompasses seven contributing buildings on a farm developed in the late-19th and early-20th centuries.  They are the brick I-house and brick smokehouse (c. 1870); four frame outbuildings (privy, chicken house, wagon shed and feed shed, c. 1890); and an octagonal barn with center silo (c. 1910).

It was listed on the National Register of Historic Places in 1992.

References

Octagon barns in the United States
Historic districts on the National Register of Historic Places in Missouri
Farms on the National Register of Historic Places in Missouri
Buildings and structures in Pike County, Missouri
National Register of Historic Places in Pike County, Missouri